Abila is a genus of lubber grasshoppers in the family Acrididae. There are at least four described species in Abila. They occur in South America.

Species
These four species belong to the genus Abila:
 Abila bolivari Giglio-Tos, 1900
 Abila christianeae Carbonell, 2002
 Abila descampsi Carbonell, 2002
 Abila latipes Stål, 1878

References

Further reading

 
 
 
 

Romaleidae
Orthoptera of South America
Taxa named by Carl Stål